Sven Heinle (born 25 January 1992) is a German judoka.

He is the gold medallist of the 2019 Judo Grand Prix Marrakesh in the +100 kg category.

References

External links
 

1992 births
Living people
German male judoka
European Games competitors for Germany
Judoka at the 2019 European Games
20th-century German people
21st-century German people